Lewis Benson Mills (February 5, 1937 – October 12, 2011) was the head men's basketball coach at the University of Richmond from 1963 to 1974 and athletic director at Virginia Commonwealth University from 1976 to 1986. In college, Mills was a point guard for the Virginia Tech Hokies and served as captain in his senior year.  He was inducted into the Virginia Tech Sports Hall of Fame in 1991. Mills also served as athletic director at Western Kentucky University from 1995 until his retirement in 1999.

Head coaching record

References

1937 births
2011 deaths
Basketball coaches from Virginia
Basketball players from Virginia
Point guards
Richmond Spiders men's basketball coaches
Sportspeople from Roanoke, Virginia
VCU Rams athletic directors
Virginia Tech Hokies men's basketball players
Western Kentucky Hilltoppers and Lady Toppers athletic directors